Jeff Lampkin (born September 21, 1961) is an American former professional boxer. During his 11-year professional career, Lampkin won the USBA cruiserweight title and IBF cruiserweight belt.

Amateur career 

Lampkin had a stellar amateur career, winning the National AAU Light Heavyweight Championship in 1980. He became a professional later that year. On June 11, 1982, Lampkin, along with another Youngstown-area boxer, Earnie Shavers, had an undercard spot on the Larry Holmes-Gerry Cooney fight.

Professional career 

Lampkin's professional boxing career peaked on March 22, 1990, when he won the IBF Cruiserweight Title with a technical knockout of British boxer Glenn McCrory, in London. He defended the belt once against Siza Makathini before vacating the title in 1991. This decision came in the wake of a controversy surrounding Lampkin's participation in an IBF bout in South Africa, which prompted the WBA and WBC to withhold recognition of his title. (Both bodies had sanctions against fighters who competed in that country.)

The IBF's subsequent failure to offer Lampkin a fight led him to request a purse offer in the summer of 1991. When IBF President Bobby Lee offered Lampkin a fight just three weeks before the bout was scheduled, a move that denied him adequate training time, the boxer concluded that the IBF had no intention of allowing him to defend his title. After vacating his title, Lampkins never challenged for a major belt again.

Later years 

Despite Lampkins' accomplishments, his economic rewards were relatively modest. Contracts he signed left the fighter with little more than $50,000, even though he won and defended a cruiserweight world champion title. The former champion indicated that frustration over the apparent mishandling of his career contributed to his decision to vacate the title. Today, Lampkin lives and works in Youngstown.

Professional boxing record

See also
List of world cruiserweight boxing champions

References

External links

!colspan=3 style="background:#C1D8FF;"| Regional boxing titles

1961 births
Living people
American male boxers
Boxers from Youngstown, Ohio
African-American boxers
Winners of the United States Championship for amateur boxers
Light-heavyweight boxers
Cruiserweight boxers
Heavyweight boxers
World cruiserweight boxing champions
International Boxing Federation champions